Kathleen M. Adams is a cultural anthropologist, Professorial Research Associate at SOAS, University of London, Professor Emerita at Loyola University Chicago, and an Adjunct Curator at the Field Museum of Natural History. Her award-winning books include Art as Politics: Re-crafting Identities, Tourism and Power in Tana Toraja, Indonesia and The Ethnography of Tourism: Edward Bruner and Beyond (with N. Leite and Q. Casteneda)'. Adams's additional books are Intersections of Tourism, Migration, and Exile (with N. Bloch),  Everyday Life in Southeast Asia (With K. Gillogly), Indonesia: History, Heritage, Culture, and Home and Hegemony: Domestic Service and Identity Politics in South and Southeast Asia (with S. Dickey). Adams is known for her research on cultural transformations in island Southeast Asia, (especially Toraja society in Indonesia), and her contributions to critical tourism studies, heritage studies, and museum studies.

A Fulbright recipient, Adams received an anthropology B.A. from the University of California, Santa Cruz, and an M.A./Ph.D. in cultural anthropology at the University of Washington. Prior to joining the Anthropology faculty at Loyola University Chicago, Adams held the Mouat Family Endowed Chair for Junior Faculty  at Beloit College. She also spent time as a visiting professor at Loyola University Chicago's John Felice Rome Center, Ateneo de Manila University, Al-Farabi Kazakh National University, the National University of Singapore and on several University of Virginia Semester at Sea voyages. Adams is currently (2021-2023) a visiting fellow at The Center for Tourism Research at Wakayama University.

Adams' book on the politics of art and tourism in Sulawesi (Indonesia) won the Alpha Sigma Nu award as the best social science book published in 2007–2009 by faculty at Jesuit institutions. Her book The Ethnography of Tourism: Edward Bruner and Beyond(co-edited with Leite and Casteneda) received the American Anthropological Association's Anthropology of Tourism Interest Group's 2020 best book award. An Isaac Manasseh Meyer Fellowship (1999) recipient, Adams' research has been supported by various organizations, including the American Philosophical Society and the Henry R. Luce Foundation. She received Loyola University's Sujack Master Researcher Award twice (2016 and 2020), Loyola University Chicago's 2007 Sujack Award for Teaching Excellence, and recognition by Princeton Review as one of the "300 best professors" in the US and Canada in 2012.

Significant publications 
 2023 Intersection of Tourism, Migration, and Exile. (Co-edited with Natalia Bloch). Routledge.
 2022 Seni Sebagai Politik. (Translated by Anwar Jimpe Rachman). Penerbit Ininnawa. 
 2020 "(Post-) Pandemic Tourism Resiliency: Southeast Asian Lives and Livelihoods in Limbo." Tourism Geographies.
 2020 "What Western Tourism Concepts Obscure: Intersections of Tourism and Migration in Indonesia." Tourism Geographies.
 2019 Indonesia: History, Heritage, Culture Key Issues in Asian Studies Series. Association for Asian Studies Press.
 2019 The Ethnography of Tourism: Edward Bruner and Beyond (Co-edited with N. Leite and Q. Casteneda). Rowman and Littlefield.
 2018 "Revisiting "Wonderful Indonesia": Tourism, Economy, and Society". The Routledge Handbook of Contemporary Indonesia, ed. by Robert Hefner. Abingdon on Thames: Routledge.
 2018 "Local Strategies for Economic Survival in Touristically Volatile Times: An Indonesian Case Study of Microvendors, Gendered Cultural Practices, and Resilience." Tourism Culture & Communication 18(4): 287–301.
 2018 "A Room with a View: Local Knowledge and Tourism Entrepreneurship in an Unlikely Indonesian Locale.” (with D. Sandarupa), Asian Journal of Tourism Research. 3(1): 1-26.
 2018 "Leisure in the 'Land of the Walking Dead': Western Mortuary Tourism, the Internet, and Zombie Pop Culture in Toraja, Indonesia." In Leisure and Death: An Anthropological Tour of Risk, Death and Dying, ed. by A. Kaul and J. Skinner. Boulder: Univ. of Colorado Press.
 2015 "Families, Funerals and Facebook: Reimag(in)ing and Curating Toraja Kin in Translocal Times.” TRaNS: Trans –Regional and –National Studies of Southeast Asia, 3(2).
 2015 Guest Editor of Special Issue "Back to the Future? Emergent Visions for Object-Based Teaching in and Beyond the Classroom.” Museum Anthropology, Vol 38(2).
 2012  "Love American Style and Divorce Toraja Style: Lessons from a Tale of Mutual Reflexivity in Indonesia,” Critical Arts 26(2).
 2011 Everyday Life in Southeast Asia. (Co-edited with Kathleen Gillogly). Indiana University Press.
 2010 "Courting and Consorting with the Global: The Local Politics of an Emerging World Heritage Site in Sulawesi, Indonesia.” In V.T. King, M. Parnwell & M. Hitchcock (eds.) Heritage Tourism in Southeast Asia, NIAS Press & Univ. of Hawai'i Press.
 2008 “The Janus-Faced Character of Tourism in Cuba: Ideological Continuity and Change.” Annals of Tourism Research, 35(1):27-46. Co-authored with Peter Sanchez.
 2006	Art as Politics: Re-crafting Identities, Tourism, and Power in Tana Toraja, Indonesia. University of Hawaii Press. (Winner of the 2009 Association of Jesuit Colleges and Universities Alpha Sigma Nu National Book Award, best in Social Sciences 2007-2009)
 2005	“Public Interest Anthropology in Heritage Sites: Writing Culture and Righting Wrongs.” International Journal of Heritage Studies, 11(5):433-439.
 2005 “Generating Theory, Tourism & “World Heritage” in Indonesia: Ethical Quandaries for Practicing Anthropologists.” National Association for the Practice of Anthropology Bulletin, 23:45-59. Part of a Special Issue on “Anthropological Contributions to Travel & Tourism: Linking Theory with Practice.”
 2004  “The Genesis of Touristic Imagery: Politics and Poetics in the Creation of a Remote Indonesian Island Destination.”  Tourist Studies, 4(2):115-135.
 2000 Home and Hegemony: Domestic Service and Identity Politics in South and Southeast Asia. (Co-edited with Sara Dickey). University of Michigan Press.

References

Other sources

External links
Kathleen M. Adams at Academia.edu
Kathleen M. Adams Faculty Page

Living people
American anthropologists
American women anthropologists
University of California, Santa Cruz alumni
University of Washington alumni
Indonesianists
Beloit College faculty
Cultural anthropologists
Tradition
Tourism researchers
People from San Francisco
Writers about globalization
Social anthropologists
Year of birth missing (living people)
American women academics
21st-century American women